Mademoiselle Modiste is a 1926 silent romance produced by and starring Corinne Griffith and distributed by First National Pictures. Robert Z. Leonard directed Griffith in a story based on a popular 1905 Victor Herbert operetta on Broadway, Mlle. Modiste, with a libretto by Henry Martyn Blossom, which was similar to the MGM film The Merry Widow. It is now considered a lost film.

The story was refilmed in 1931 as the talkie Kiss Me Again.

Cast
Corinne Griffith as Fifi
Norman Kerry as Etienne
Willard Louis as Hiram Bent
Dorothy Cumming as Marianne
Rose Dione as Madame Claire
Peggy Blake (Undetermined Role)

References

External links

Lobby poster

1926 films
American silent feature films
Films directed by Robert Z. Leonard
Lost American films
First National Pictures films
Films based on operettas
American films based on plays
Films based on adaptations
1920s romance films
American black-and-white films
American romance films
1920s American films